André Couto (born 14 December 1976) is a Macanese motor racing driver who is best known for winning his home F3 Grand Prix in 2000 and Japan's Super GT GT300 Championship in 2015.

Career

Early years
André Couto was born in Lisbon but moved to Macau with his family when he was four. He started his career in Karting in Macau influenced by the popular Macau Grand Prix and friends who competed in the local Karting championship. He rapidly enjoyed success and started competing and winning in international level.
He moved to racing cars in 1995 where he competed in European Formula Opel Lotus (Winning a round in the Estoril Circuit). 1995 was also the debut year in the Formula Three event of the Macau Grand Prix where he briefly led after a duel with race winner Ralf Schumacher.

Formula Three
Couto competed in German Formula Three in 1996 before moving to the Italian series in 1997, where he finished the season as runner-up in the championship.

2000 Macau Grand Prix
He competed in the F3 Macau Grand Prix six times, eventually winning it in 2000, after India's Narain Karthikeyan, 24, and Japan's Takuma Sato, 23, crashed out of contention in leg one. Couto, driving for Opel Team BSR and starting second on the grid for the decider, took the lead immediately and fought off the intentions of Paolo Montin, 24, and Japan's Ryo Fukuda, 21. When Robert Lechner crashed with two laps to go, the safety car was called out and the drivers drove in formation behind it to the chequered flag. It marked the first time a Macanese driver has won the Formula 3 race title.

Couto's win was a surreal experience for many but for Couto's father, Carlos, it was the proudest moment of his life. "This was the one race Andre always wanted to win," he said. "He was born in Lisbon but we moved back to Macau when he was four. My wife Isabel and I have now lived in Macau for many years. Isabel was born here and all her family is from here. This will always be Andre's home. He speaks fluent Cantonese like most Portuguese people living here. He is a Macau citizen; it is what he wanted. We've lived here happily for many years. Today is a special day for everyone in Macau."

Formula 3000
Couto graduated to Formula 3000 in 1998 and stayed there for 1999 and 2000.  Although he scored points on several occasions, he never achieved any great success. His best result was third place at the Nürburgring in 2000.

An assortment of drives

After leaving F3000 and winning the Macau Grand Prix Formula Three event in 2000, Couto competed in the Formula Nippon Championship in 2001 and competed in some races of the All-Japan GT Championship. For 2002 he moved to the World Series by Nissan, and finished seventh in the championship.

Touring car racing and sports car racing
Since 2003, Couto has competed frequently in the Guia Race of Macau as part of the European Touring Car Championship (ETCC) and later the World Touring Car Championship. He has competed at the race on different cars and teams: Alfa Romeo 156 and Honda Accord (for N.Technology), and SEAT León (for SEAT Sport and Sunred),

Since 2005, Couto has competed in the Super GT Championship in the GT500-class Lexus SC430, initially for SARD and in 2011 for Kraft. In November 2015, racing alongside his teammate Katsumasa Chiyo, André Couto was crowned the GT 300 champion with one round to go into the Super GT championship. He dedicated the victory to a “special one”, his late son Afonso, who succumbed to leukemia in 2010. Couto's GT300 title victory in 2015 made him the first foreign driver to win the GT300 drivers championship title and the only one to do so until João Paulo de Oliveira achieved a similar feat in 2020. Since Chiyo missed two rounds due to other obligations, Couto is also the first driver to win a Super GT driver's title on their own since both Ryo Michigami and Hideo Fukuyama in 2000. 

On 8 July 2017, André Couto was seriously hurt after crashing his Nissan GT-R GT3 in the China GT Championship race at Zhuhai International Circuit. He was taken to Sun Yat-sen University No.5 Hospital in Zhuhai for a CT scan that revealed a fracture to his L1 vertebra. He was then air lifted to Canossa Hospital in Hong Kong for an operation. Couto's father, Carlos, said that his son was not in a life-threatening situation.

Personal life
Couto had a son, Afonso, who was diagnosed with leukaemia in November 2009.  Several of his fellow WTCC drivers have carried stickers on their cars in the 2010 WTCC season to promote a website which is trying to find a suitable bone marrow donor. The GT Association and all teams of Super GT also launched a campaign towards bone marrow donation. A suitable bone marrow for Afonso was found on 9 May 2010 in Germany and his operation was successfully completed on 20 May 2010.
Afonso died on 3 November 2010 from leukaemia treatment complications. He had been in the hospital for two weeks.

Racing record

Complete International Formula 3000 results
(key) (Races in bold indicate pole position; races in italics indicate fastest lap.)

Complete Formula Nippon results
(key)

Complete JGTC/Super GT results
(key) (Races in bold indicate pole position) (Races in italics indicate fastest lap)

Complete European Touring Car Championship results
(key) (Races in bold indicate pole position) (Races in italics indicate fastest lap)

Complete World Touring Car Championship results
(key) (Races in bold indicate pole position) (Races in italics indicate fastest lap)

Complete World Touring Car Cup results
(key) (Races in bold indicate pole position) (Races in italics indicate fastest lap)

References
André Couto career statistics at driverdb.com, retrieved 11 November 2006.

External links

Official website (under construction)
Fan Site (Japanese) (Archived 2009-10-25)
Save Afonso (Couto's son)
 (News of Afonso's death)

Living people
1976 births
Portuguese racing drivers
Macau racing drivers
Macau people of Portuguese descent
International Formula 3000 drivers
Formula Nippon drivers
German Formula Three Championship drivers
Italian Formula Three Championship drivers
World Touring Car Championship drivers
Super GT drivers
Karting World Championship drivers
Blancpain Endurance Series drivers
European Touring Car Championship drivers
Opel Team BSR drivers
Prema Powerteam drivers
Phoenix Racing drivers
Cupra Racing drivers